BICOM may refer to:
 Britain Israel Communications and Research Centre
 Brunel Institute of Computational Mathematics